¿Dónde está el país de las hadas? (Where is fairyland?) is the second album recorded by Spanish synth-pop band Mecano, in 1983. The album was produced by Jorge Álvarez and Mecano.

The album only had three singles: the first, "Barco a Venus", later became one of the most important singles in Mecano's history. "La Fiesta Nacional" and "El Amante de Fuego" followed as singles.

Track listing

Singles

Charts

Credits and personnel 
Recording and management
 Strings and brass were recorded in CBS Studio 1 (London), Engineer: Mike Ross
 Recorded and mixed in digital system in Scorpio Studios (Madrid), Engineer: Tino Azores
 Graphic Concept: Juan Oreste Gatti
 Flower pictures: Julio Lima
 Mecano pictures: Alejandro Cabrera

Vocals and instrumentation
 Ana Torroja – vocals
 Nacho Cano – keyboards, chorus
 Jose Maria Cano – guitars, chorus
 Luis Cobos – arrangements, orchestral direction
 Manolo Aguilar – bass
 Javier de Juan – drums
 Gustavo Montesano – guitars

References 

1983 albums
Mecano albums
Columbia Records albums
Spanish-language albums